David Gore (April 7, 1827 – October 10, 1911) was an American politician and farmer.

Born in Trigg County, Kentucky, Gore moved to Madison County, Illinois with his parents in 1834. He served in the United States Army during the Mexican–American War and served as quartermaster. After the war, Gore moved to Macoupin County, Illinois and settled in Carlinville, Illinois. Gore was a farmer. In 1874, Gore ran for the office of Illinois Treasurer on the Greenback Party ticket and lost the election. Gore served in the Illinois State Senate from 1883 to 1887. He also served on the Illinois Board of Agriculture from 1878 to 1896 and was president of the board. Gore was a Democrat. From 1893 to 1897, Gore served as the Auditor of Public Accounts, State of Illinois. In 1910, Gore moved to Benton Harbor, Michigan to live with his son. Gore died at his son's house in Benton Harbor, Michigan.

Notes

External links

1827 births
1911 deaths
People from Carlinville, Illinois
People from Trigg County, Kentucky
People from Benton Harbor, Michigan
Military personnel from Kentucky
American military personnel of the Mexican–American War
Farmers from Illinois
Illinois Democrats
Illinois Greenbacks
Illinois state senators
Auditors of Public Accounts of Illinois